The National Basilica of the Sacred Heart is a Roman Catholic Minor Basilica and parish church in Brussels, Belgium. It is dedicated to the Sacred Heart, inspired by the Basilique du Sacré-Coeur in Paris. Symbolically, King Leopold II laid the first stone in 1905 during the celebrations of the 75th anniversary of Belgian Independence. The construction was halted by the two World Wars and finished only in 1970. Belonging to the Metropolitan Archdiocese of Mechelen–Brussels, it is one of the largest churches by area in the world.

Located at the head of Elisabeth Park atop the Koekelberg hill, between the municipalities of Koekelberg and Ganshoren, the church is popularly known as the Koekelberg Basilica. On a clear day, the basilica can be recognised with the naked eye from dozens of kilometres away outside Brussels.

History

Inception
In the mid-19th century, King Leopold I dreamed of turning the uninhabited Koekelberg hill in north-western Brussels into a royal residence area. After his death, his son, King Leopold II, envisaged building a Belgian Panthéon dedicated to Great Belgians there, inspired by the French Panthéon in Paris, to commemorate the 50th anniversary of Belgian Independence. The king dropped this project due to the lack of enthusiasm of the Belgian population. It is nonetheless still attested today by the two large avenues—the / and the /—that adjoin the site.

In 1902, Leopold II visited the Basilique du Sacré-Coeur of Paris, and inspired by it, decided to build a pilgrimage church back home, a national sanctuary dedicated to the Sacred Heart of Jesus.

Neo-Gothic basilica (1905–1914)
The initial project of the Leuven-based architect  was a sumptuous neo-Gothic basilica inspired by the "ideal cathedral" of the French architectural theorist Eugène Viollet-le-Duc.

Leopold II laid the first stone on 12 October 1905 during the celebrations commemorating the 75th anniversary of Belgian Independence. The foundation works started in 1909, but the project was delayed due to the king's death on 17 December 1909. Financing the basilica's construction also soon became a problem, so only the foundations had been finished when World War I broke out. In his pastoral letter for Christmas 1914, Cardinal Mercier gave the basilica a new meaning:

Art Deco basilica (1919–present)
On 29 June 1919, King Albert I and a large crowd associated themselves with this promise in a ceremony on the Koekelberg hill. However, it was impossible to resume Langerock's plan due to the state of public finances. A new project, in Art Deco style of neo-Byzantine inspiration, by the Ghent architect , was thus adopted. In 1925, a 1/40 scale model of this final design won the great architectural prize at the International Exhibition of Modern Decorative and Industrial Arts in Paris. This model, produced with the greatest care, still stands today in the basilica.

The adaptation and extension of the existing foundations were undertaken from January 1926, and the building the apse began in August 1930. After Van Huffel's death on 16 March 1935, the construction was taken over by his assistant, the architect-engineer Paul Rome. Cardinal Jozef-Ernest van Roey consecrated the unfinished basilica and opened it for worship on 14 October 1935, after obtaining a special authorisation from Pope Pius XI. The base of the cupola was finished in 1940 when World War II brought a new halt to the works. Building resumed in September 1944 and the main nave was completed in 1951.

The basilica was consecrated by Cardinal Van Roey on 13 and 14 October 1951, and Pope Pius XII assigned it the title of Minor Basilica on 28 January 1952. In 1953, the two towers were completed. The south transept opened in 1958 and the north transept in 1962. The cupola and thus the external structure was finished in 1969, and on 11 November 1970, the ceremony for the 25th anniversary of the episcopate of Archbishop of Mechelen–Brussels, Cardinal Leo Joseph Suenens, marked the completion of the basilica's construction. On 4 June 1995, Father Damien was beatified in the basilica by Pope John Paul II.

Building

Dimensions
It remains today one of the largest basilicas and can accommodate 3,500 people.

This enormous building houses Catholic Church celebrations in the two main Belgian national languages (Dutch and French), as well as conferences, exhibitions (as in 2007–08, the International Leonardo da Vinci Expo), a restaurant, a Catholic radio station, a theatre and two museums.

Exterior
The building's exterior combines reinforced concrete with terracotta layering, Dutch belvédère bricks, and white dimension stone from Burgundy. The green roofs and domes are clad in Congolese copper.

The narthex-portal has a large balcony intended for open-air masses, the parapet of which was carved with a bas-relief depicting Christ the Merciful. Its pillars are extended by statues of the four evangelists by the Belgian-Danish sculptor . From left to right, they depict Saint John and his eagle (1955), Saint Luke carrying the bull (1958), Saint Mark enlaced by the lion (1958), and Saint Matthew with man (1964).

Interior
The basilica's interior possesses a rich architectural heritage and holds an exceptional collection of works of art, including Tête du Christ bronze sculpture by Constant Permeke, thirty-one engravings by Joan Miró about the Canticle of the Sun by Saint Francis of Assisi, a painting by Antoni Tàpies, a photographic work by  called When Jesus Became Christ on the theme of the crucifixion, seven original lithographs by Alfred Manessier on the theme of Easter and the Mount of Olives, works by James Ensor, a painting by Geneviève Asse on the biblical theme, as well as paintings by Albert Servaes. The painter Anto Carte designed the eight stained glass windows representing the life of Jesus, and the artist  an additional twenty-eight.

The altar, the liturgical furniture and the cross in the choir are the work of the sculptor . The basilica also contains two organs: a large 1959 modern choir organ and a 1965 classical choir organ in the crypt.

Panoramic view
The basilica, on the Koekelberg hill, is a landmark on the Brussels skyline. The cupola's platform offers an excellent panoramic view of Brussels and the wider region of Flemish Brabant. Visitors can reach the platform either by stairs or by two elevators commissioned in the spring of 2012, in the form of a cage and two fully glazed cabins.

See also
 List of churches in Brussels
 List of basilicas
 List of tallest domes
 Roman Catholicism in Belgium
 Art Deco in Brussels
 History of Brussels
 Belgium in "the long nineteenth century"

References

Notes

Sources

External links

 Official website of the National Basilica of the Sacred Heart
 Virtual visit of the Basilica of Koekelberg
 Discovery guide with high quality pictures of the Basilica of the Sacred Heart in Brussels

Roman Catholic churches in Brussels
Basilica churches in Belgium
Koekelberg
Tourist attractions in Brussels
Art Deco architecture in Belgium
20th-century Roman Catholic church buildings in Belgium
Roman Catholic churches completed in 1969
1905 in Belgium
Church buildings with domes